Masilo Esau Mabeta was the South African Ambassador to Liberia.  When he presented his credentials on April 5, 2011, he became the first Resident Ambassador from South Africa.  He was also the South African ambassador to the Comoros from 2004 to 2010. He was a member of the African National Congress.  He had been in exile for at least ten years.

He graduated from Harvard University for a thesis titled Conflict Resolution in Zimbabwe: The Role of the United States of America in 1985.

References

Ambassadors of South Africa to Liberia
Harvard University alumni
Ambassadors of South Africa to the Comoros